The Sassafras Site, designated RI-55, is a prehistoric archaeological site in Albion, a village of Lincoln, Rhode Island.  The site was discovered by archaeologists while surveying an area for a potential replacement for the Albion Street bridge, which spans the Blackstone River between Lincoln and Cumberland.  The site encompasses a regionally significant quartz stone tool workshop.

The site was listed on the National Register of Historic Places in 1984.

See also
National Register of Historic Places listings in Providence County, Rhode Island

References

Archaeological sites on the National Register of Historic Places in Rhode Island
Cumberland, Rhode Island
Lincoln, Rhode Island
National Register of Historic Places in Providence County, Rhode Island
Quartz